Annie Pelletier (born December 22, 1973) is a retired female diver from Canada, who won the bronze medal in the women's 3 metres springboard event at the 1996 Summer Olympics in Atlanta, Georgia. She was affiliated with the Club Aquatique Montréal Olympique during her career.

For August 2008, she was a diving commentator for Télévision de Radio-Canada at the 2008 Beijing Olympics.

See also
 Anne Montminy, fellow diver, 2008 Olympics diving commentator for CBC Television

References

External links
 
 
 
 

1973 births
Commonwealth Games gold medallists for Canada
Divers at the 1994 Commonwealth Games
Divers at the 1996 Summer Olympics
French Quebecers
Living people
Olympic bronze medalists for Canada
Olympic divers of Canada
Divers from Montreal
Medalists at the 1996 Summer Olympics
Olympic medalists in diving
Canadian female divers
World Aquatics Championships medalists in diving
Pan American Games gold medalists for Canada
Pan American Games silver medalists for Canada
Commonwealth Games medallists in diving
Pan American Games medalists in diving
Universiade medalists in diving
Divers at the 1995 Pan American Games
Universiade silver medalists for Canada
Medalists at the 1995 Pan American Games
Medallists at the 1994 Commonwealth Games